Daniel Álvarez López (born 22 July 1994), also known as Fideo, is a Mexican professional footballer who plays as a winger for Liga MX club Puebla.

Honours
Necaxa
Copa MX: Clausura 2018
Supercopa MX: 2018

Mexico U23
Pan American Silver Medal: 2015
CONCACAF Olympic Qualifying Championship: 2015

References

External links 

 

1994 births
Living people
Footballers from Guadalajara, Jalisco
Association football forwards
Mexican footballers
Mexico international footballers
Mexico youth international footballers
Footballers at the 2015 Pan American Games
Pan American Games medalists in football
Pan American Games silver medalists for Mexico
Atlas F.C. footballers
Club Necaxa footballers
Liga MX players
Medalists at the 2015 Pan American Games